Yagodnaya (Yeläkle) is a rural locality (a village) in Iglinsky Selsoviet, Iglinsky District, Bashkortostan, Russia. The population was 471 as of 2010. There are 10 streets.

Geography 
Yagodnaya is located 5 km south of Iglino (the district's administrative centre) by road. Iglino is the nearest rural locality.

References 

Rural localities in Iglinsky District